Beddomeia hullii is a species of very small freshwater snail that has a gill and an operculum, an aquatic operculate gastropod mollusc in the family Hydrobiidae. This species is endemic to Australia.

See also
List of non-marine molluscs of Australia

References

External links

Gastropods of Australia
Hydrobiidae
Beddomeia
Vulnerable fauna of Australia
Endemic fauna of Australia
Gastropods described in 1889
Taxonomy articles created by Polbot
Freshwater molluscs of Oceania